Florian Hermann (18221892, name is also spelled as Florian Herman, Florian German, Florjan Herman) was a composer of German-Polish origin in the Russian Empire. Although he authored many works, Hermann is primarily notable as an author of the melody used in the music for the well-known Russian song "Dark eyes" (the composer wrote his opus as "Valse hommage", Op. 21). Very little is known about Hermann, Russian publications occasionally describe him as a French or Austrian composer. 

Hermann's work as a composer spans 1870s1890s, according to the list available in a catalog by A. Gutheil (his company was later acquired by Éditions Russes de Musique), the earliest known publications are from A. Büttner in St. Petersburg. Hermann's other best-known composition is "Rêverie russe, Op. 2". "Valse hommage" became famous as "Dark Eyes" after an arrangement in the Gypsy style by S. Gerdal (1884); the popular rendition belongs to Adalgiso Ferraris (ca. 1910).

References

Sources 
 

Composers from the Russian Empire